Kuruthipunal may refer to:

Kuruthipunal (novel), a novel by Indira Parthasarathy
Kuruthipunal (film), a 1995 film by P. C. Sreeram starring Kamal Haasan and Arjun Sarja